Central European Midsummer Time (CEMT) was a time zone three hours ahead of GMT, used as a double summer time in several European countries during the 1940s.

Usage

France 
Some parts of France, but not Paris, observed Central European Midsummer Time in 1941–1945.

Germany 
Central European Midsummer Time was used in occupied Germany from 11 May, 03:00 CEST to 29 June 1947, 03:00 CEMT.

According to GHEP, Berlin and the Soviet Occupation Zone observed midsummer time from 24 May 1945, 02:00 CET to 24 September 1945, 03:00 CEMT. Midsummer time was equivalent to Moscow Time, which did not observe DST then.

Notes

See also
 Time in Germany
 UTC+03:00
 Other countries and territories in UTC+3 time zone

Time zones